The sixteenth season of the American competitive reality television series Hell's Kitchen premiered on September 23, 2016 on Fox. Gordon Ramsay returned as host/head chef, Marino Monferrato and Aaron Mitrano returned as maitre d' and blue kitchen sous chef respectively while Andi van Willigan-Cutspec resumed her role as sous chef for the red team after Season 10 winner Christina Wilson filled in for her in the previous season while she got married. This was also the first season since Season 13 to take a hiatus due to Fox's coverage of the 2016 World Series in addition to the holiday breaks. The remaining episodes of the season were moved to Thursday nights on January 5, 2017 as part of the network's midseason schedule. This is the first season to have episode titles other than the usual "(Remaining number of) Chefs Compete" and "Winner Chosen". This season was filmed between November to December 2014, shortly after the completion of the previous season, about two years before the season aired.

Event Chef Kimberly-Ann Ryan from Traverse City, Michigan won the competition and a head chef position at Yardbird Southern Table & Bar at The Venetian Las Vegas.

Chefs
Eighteen chefs compete in season 16.

Notes

Contestant progress

Episodes

Ratings

U.S. Nielsen ratings

Notes

References

Hell's Kitchen (American TV series)
2016 American television seasons
2017 American television seasons